The 1990 European Karate Championships, the 25th edition, was held in Vienna, Austria from May 2 to 4, 1990.

Medallists

Men's Competition

Individual

Team

Women's competition

Individual

Team

References

External links
 Karate Records - European Championship 1990

1990
International sports competitions hosted by Austria
European Karate Championship
European championships in 1990
Sports competitions in Vienna
1990s in Vienna
Karate competitions in Austria
May 1990 sports events in Europe